Antennoseius koroljevae is a species of mite in the family Ascidae.

References

Ascidae
Articles created by Qbugbot
Animals described in 1984